The Borborema Plateau (Portuguese Planalto da Borborema, also known as the Serra da Borborema) is a plateau in northeastern Brazil which extends across the states of Pernambuco, Paraíba, and Rio Grande do Norte. The plateau is the northeasternmost portion of the Brazilian Highlands and is the most relevant watershed of its region. More than 100 rivers originate from the plateau, including the  Moxotó, Mundaú, Pajeú, Paraíba do Norte, Seridó, and Una.

The Borborema Plateau serves as an orographic barrier, despite its relatively low elevation, against the moist easterly winds of the Atlantic Ocean. Areas west of the plateau, which make up part of the sertão, are arid and prone to drought. The Pajeú River, the largest tributary of the São Francisco River, originates from the Borborema.

Geology 
The Borborema Plateau is part of a huge anastomosing shear zone. The plateau is composed primarily of igneous and metamorphic rock.

References

Mountain ranges of Brazil